Surfer is an integrated advertising campaign launched in 1999 by Diageo to promote Guinness-brand draught stout in the United Kingdom. The cornerstone of the campaign is a television commercial, originally 60 seconds long, which centred on a Polynesian surfer successfully taking on a gigantic wave. Shot in Hawaii over a nine-day period and directed by Jonathan Glazer, the piece went on to win more awards than any other commercial in 1999 (Clio Awards, D&AD Awards, Cannes Lions), and in 2002 was voted the "Best ad of all time" in a poll conducted by Channel 4 and The Sunday Times.

The plot centers on a group of surfers, waiting for the perfect wave. As it arrives, the crashing 'white horses' turn into actual horses. One by one, a surfer 'crashes out', leaving only one, who manages to conquer the wave. The others join him  as they celebrate on the shore.

The advert was inspired by Walter Crane's 1893 painting "Neptune's Horses".  The text also draws inspiration from Herman Melville's novel Moby Dick, including the line "Ahab says, 'I don't care who you are, here's to your dream.'" (which does not actually appear in the novel).

The music track in the advert was created by British band Leftfield and eventually this formed the basis of their track "Phat Planet" which appears on their 1999 album Rhythm and Stealth. Its use in the advertisement led to the song appearing on several compilation albums of music from advertisements including Classic Ads (2002), I Love TV Ads (2004) and Guinness 250: Music from the TV Ads (2009).

An extended 90-second version is available on the 2005 DVD The Work of Director Jonathan Glazer.

In November 2009, The Independent named the advertisement, alongside several other advertisements in the campaign, amongst the "greatest advertising of all time".

Accolades

The asterisk (*) denotes an unordered list.

Additional credits
Account Executive: Gavin Thompson
Creative Director: David Abbott
Copywriter: Tom Carty
Art Director: Walter Campbell
Directors of Photography: Ivan Bird, Don King (water), Lee Allison (aerial)
Production Designer: Ben Myhill
Editor: Sam Sneade, Sam Sneade Editing, London
Sound Design  Wave Studios, London
Sound Designer: Johnnie Burn 
Music Production Company: Soundtree Music Limited (www.soundtreemusic.com)
Music Supervisor: Peter Raeburn
VFX: The Computer Film Company, London
VFX Designers: Dan Glass / Adrian de Wet / Paddy Eason / Tom Debenham
VFX Artists: Gavin Toomey / Alex Payman / Joe Pavlo
VFX 3D Supervisor: Dominic Parker

References

Guinness advertising
British television commercials
1999 in British television